Aiguille du Goûter (3,863 m) is a mountain in the Mont Blanc massif of Haute-Savoie, France.

Mountains of the Alps
Alpine three-thousanders
Mountains of Haute-Savoie